Ted Dowd is a British television and radio producer. His work includes: This Time & Mid Morning Matters with Alan Partridge, Gavin & Stacey, Saxondale, Nighty Night, Hunderby, Camping, Ideal, The Mighty Boosh, Moone Boy, Home Time and Nebulous.

External links

British radio producers
British television producers
Living people
Year of birth missing (living people)
Place of birth missing (living people)
21st-century British people